Alexander Quirin (born 27 February 1970) is a retired German football defender.

References

1970 births
Living people
German footballers
FC 08 Homburg players
Borussia Neunkirchen players
2. Bundesliga players
Association football defenders